Kentrell Brothers (born February 8, 1993) is an American football linebacker who is currently a free agent. He played college football at the University of Missouri. He was drafted by the Minnesota Vikings in the fifth round of the 2016 NFL Draft.

High school career
Kentrell attended Guthrie High School in Guthrie, Oklahoma, where he was a two-way star for the Bluejays football team at defensive end and wide receiver. During a playoff game in his junior year, Brothers roasted an Oklahoma-committed offensive lineman in a game against Duncan for four sacks. As a senior, he turned around and recorded five sacks on the same commit against Duncan in week 1, and also managed to score three touchdowns in that game. Following his junior season at Guthrie, Missouri became the first school to offer him a scholarship offer. Over the course of his senior year in which he posted over 100 tackles and 19 sacks as a defensive end and caught 63 balls for 1,304 yards and 18 touchdowns at wide receiver, the number of scholarships ballooned to 14 offers from all across the country. In addition to football, Brothers also participated in basketball and tennis at Guthrie.

Brothers was regarded as a three-star recruit by Rivals.com and committed to the University of Missouri to play college football on November 11, 2010.

College career
After redshirting his first year at Missouri in 2011 due to an injury, Brothers played in 11 games as a redshirt freshman in 2012 and recorded 14 tackles. As a sophomore in 2013, Brothers became a starter and started all 14 games. He finished the year with 70 tackles, three interceptions and one sack. As a junior in 2014, he had a team-leading 122 tackles.

Statistics

Professional career

Minnesota Vikings

At the NFL Combine, Brothers ran the 40-yard dash in 4.89 seconds, which ranked 27th among 31 linebackers, but his 4.73-second sprint at Missouri Pro Day would have tied him for the fifth-fastest among inside-linebacker prospects. In addition, he also improved his vertical jump 3 inches to  inches and matched his bench press with a personal-record 19 repetitions.

Brothers was drafted by the Minnesota Vikings in the fifth round, 160th overall, in the 2016 NFL Draft.

Brothers didn't play any defensive snaps as a rookie, but he contributed to the team as a special teamer, finishing third on the Vikings with nine special teams tackles. He was the only player to make two units on the All-PFF Special Teams teams.

On April 20, 2018, Brothers was suspended the first four games for violating the NFL's performance-enhancing drugs policy. After becoming a free agent following the 2019 NFL season, Brothers was suspended for the first nine weeks of the 2020 NFL season on July 17, 2020. He was reinstated from suspension on November 10, 2020.

Montreal Alouettes
Brothers signed with the Montreal Alouettes of the CFL on February 17, 2021.

NFL career statistics

References

External links
Missouri Tigers bio

1993 births
Living people
People from Guthrie, Oklahoma
Players of American football from Oklahoma
American football linebackers
Missouri Tigers football players
Minnesota Vikings players
Montreal Alouettes players